The 1972 Montreal Expos season was the fourth season in the history of the franchise. The Expos finished in fifth place in the National League East with a record of 70–86, 26½ games behind the Pittsburgh Pirates.

Offseason 
 November 29, 1971: Tom Walker was drafted by the Expos from the Baltimore Orioles in the 1971 rule 5 draft.
 December 6, 1971: Adolfo Phillips was purchased by the Expos from the Cleveland Indians.
 January 28, 1972: Claude Raymond was released by the Expos.
 March 24, 1972: César Gutiérrez was purchased by the Expos from the Detroit Tigers.

Spring training
The Expos held spring training at West Palm Beach Municipal Stadium in West Palm Beach, Florida, a facility they shared with the Atlanta Braves. It was their fourth season at the stadium. The following season, the Expos would move their spring training activities to City Island Ball Park in Daytona Beach, Florida, where they would train through 1980 before returning to West Palm Beach Municipal Stadium for the 1981 through 1997 seasons.

Regular season 
 October 2, 1972: Bill Stoneman pitched his second career no-hitter (the final score of this one was also 7–0) in the first game of a doubleheader against the New York Mets at Jarry Park. The no-hitter was the first ever pitched outside the United States. Future broadcaster Tim McCarver was Stoneman's catcher.

Opening Day lineup

Season standings

Record vs. opponents

Notable transactions 
 April 5, 1972: Rusty Staub was traded by the Expos to the New York Mets for Ken Singleton, Mike Jorgensen, and Tim Foli.
 July 10, 1972: Bobby Wine was released by the Expos.

Draft picks 
 June 6, 1972: 1972 Major League Baseball draft
Ellis Valentine was drafted by the Expos in the 2nd round.
Gary Carter was drafted by the Expos in the 3rd round.
Mike Hart was drafted by the Expos in the 11th round.
Keith Drumright was drafted by the Expos in the 18th round, but did not sign.

Roster

Player stats

Batting

Starters by position 
Note: Pos = Position; G = Games played; AB = At bats; H = Hits; Avg. = Batting average; HR = Home runs; RBI = Runs batted in

Other batters 
Note: G = Games played; AB = At bats; H = Hits; Avg. = Batting average; HR = Home runs; RBI = Runs batted in

Pitching

Starting pitchers 
Note: G = Games pitched; IP = Innings pitched; W = Wins; L = Losses; ERA = Earned run average; SO = Strikeouts

Other pitchers 
Note: G = Games pitched; IP = Innings pitched; W = Wins; L = Losses; ERA = Earned run average; SO = Strikeouts

Relief pitchers 
Note: G = Games pitched; W = Wins; L = Losses; SV = Saves; ERA = Earned run average; SO = Strikeouts

Awards and honors 
1972 Major League Baseball All-Star Game

Farm system

Notes

References 

 1972 Montreal Expos at Baseball Reference
 1972 Montreal Expos at Baseball Almanac
 

Montreal Expos seasons
Montreal Expos season
1970s in Montreal
1972 in Quebec